Kumhausen is a municipality in the district of Landshut in Bavaria in Germany.

It broke the record on June 27, 1999. It was made by 15 butchers, leading was Bernhard Ossner. Also said to set a record. Spectators had a chance to buy the sausage at the price of five German marks (US$2.65) per meter, with proceeds going to a charity for Romanian children.

References

Landshut (district)